"Connected by Love" is a song written, produced and performed by American rock musician Jack White, issued as the lead single from his third studio album Boarding House Reach. The song peaked at #18 on the Billboard Alternative Songs chart in 2018.

On April 14, 2018, Jack White performed "Connected by Love" on Saturday Night Live.

Music video

The official music video for "Connected by Love" was directed by Pasqual Gutierrez.

Chart positions

References

External links
 
 

2017 songs
2018 singles
Third Man Records singles
Song recordings produced by Jack White
Songs written by Jack White
Jack White songs